Jon Holmes (born 24 April 1973) is a British comedian, writer, presenter and broadcaster known for his work on such programmes as The Skewer,The Now Show, Listen Against (for BBC Radio 4), along with both music and spoken word radio. He has appeared on numerous television programmes.

Early life
Born in Stratford-upon-Avon, Holmes was raised in Nuneaton, Warwickshire, Holmes was adopted when he was aged one month. He attended Canterbury Christ Church College, where he graduated with a joint degree in English with radio, film and television. He became involved with university radio station C4 Radio and also wrote, directed and performed in various student revue shows; he became a presenter on Canterbury's local radio station KMFM Canterbury (then CTFM).

Career

After graduation, Holmes's first foray into BBC radio comedy was for BBC Radio 4 with his debut comedy series Grievous Bodily Radio in 1997. He also had a show on Power FM on Sunday nights. The Jon & Andy Show (with Andy Hurst), which Holmes presented during 1998–2000, won him a gold Sony Radio Academy Award for entertainment. This was where Holmes began to acquire his reputation for controversy with on air interactive listener games such as 'I'm Standing On...' (a time trial in which listeners were encouraged to stand on their neighbour's car or wheelie bin, etc. and shout "I'm Standing On....' whatever it was until their angry neighbour came out and shouted abuse).

In 2001 Holmes co-created the Radio 4 show Dead Ringers, for which he jointly won his second gold Sony, and the show transferred to BBC Two television.

He then moved to XFM London "for approximately an hour"  before being fired for going to the toilet on air in fellow presenter Dermot O'Leary's desk drawer. Subsequently, the late-night Jon Holmes show on Virgin Radio ran from 2001 to 2002, but Holmes was fired after several controversial stunts. Virgin was fined a record £75,000 for Holmes's feature "Swearing Radio Hangman for the Under-12s", in which he persuaded a nine-year-old girl to spell out and then repeat the phrase "soapy tit wank". Unrepentant, Holmes's own website boasts: "Jon still holds the record for 'largest fine ever for taste and decency offences in British broadcasting'. Sadly he didn’t get a certificate or anything."

Meanwhile, on BBC Radio 4, Holmes was writing and appearing on The Now Show and The 99p Challenge, where he first worked with Armando Iannucci. Since then he has worked with Iannucci on Gash (Channel 4, 2003) and Time Trumpet (BBC2, 2006), and in 2006 he received his sixth Sony Award for his work on Radio 4's Armando Iannucci's Charm Offensive.

He also hosted a spin-off BBC Radio 7 radio series and official podcast of the American drama series Heroes, featuring on BBC Two in the UK.

Throughout 2007, Holmes presented the Friday afternoon drivetime show on London talk station LBC, leaving in January 2008 when the station's new owners made the station more news-based.

In November 2007 he began a new Radio 4 series, Listen Against, which he co-presented with newsreader Alice Arnold. The show "takes the programmes out of the radio, fiddles around with them and then puts them back together the wrong way round". The programme was well received, The Daily Telegraph calling the show "beautifully crafted" and "sharp". The Guardian described it as "the mischievous offspring of Radio 4's Feedback and The Day Today. Series 2 began on Radio 4 in November 2008 and Series 3 was broadcast in the summer of 2010. "Were the Python team starting out today, they might conceivably come up with something like the utterly fabulous Listen Against." – Independent on Sunday. "Sly, satirical, smart and very funny. Natural successor to on the Hour and The Day Today." – Sunday Telegraph. The show was listed in the Telegraphs 'Top 10 Programmes of 2010' and was nominated for The Independents 2010 'Why I Pay My Licence Fee' Award.

A BBC Radio 2 film panel show, I'm Spartacus, aired on the network in April 2009 while also on Radio 2. Holmes co-wrote and co-presented The Day the Music Died alongside Andrew Collins. He has also fronted his own BBC Radio 1 show and from 2006 to 2012 had his own weekend show on BBC Radio 6 Music.

Holmes was a regular contributor to the Radio 4 programme Loose Ends where he interviewed a variety of big-name guests, while on BBC Radio 5 Live he produced the quirky magazine show Men's Hour and presented Mob Rule with Jon Holmes, described as 'Points of View for nutters".

On 19 December 2012, it was announced that Holmes would be taking over from Danny Wallace as presenter of the XFM London breakfast show from 7 January 2013. A podcast to accompany the show was released on 11 January 2013, charting at number 13 in the UK iTunes Podcast chart. The show ran on weekdays between 6am and 10am. Holmes made the headlines again after a controversial joke about the Irish at the Winter Olympics. Holmes was nominated for 'Presenter of the Year' at the 2015 Commercial Radio Awards.

In 2016, Holmes' contract for The Now Show was not renewed after 18 years, according to the performer because of the BBC's obligation to increase the proportion of women and ethnic minorities featured in its programmes. Holmes has said that he was informed of this reason for the non-renewal of his contract in a telephone call from a BBC manager.

In March 2016 it was announced that Holmes would move to the new-to-launch speech station Talkradio to present the weekday afternoon slot. It became the most listened to show on the new station (Rajar Q2 2017), but with the takeover of Talkradio's parent company by Rupert Murdoch's News UK, it was revealed that from January 2018 the station's programme and sponsorship focus would be shifted to align with The Sun newspaper. Holmes left the station, and his final show was on 12 January 2018.

Since 2018 Holmes has been a travel writer for The Sunday Times. He has been nominated for (and has won) a number of awards, including Travel Writer of The Year, for which he was highly commended for 2020.

Following a pilot in 2019, since January 2020 Holmes has produced his BBC Radio 4 soundscape dark satire The Skewer. It has won multiple international awards for comedy and sound design.

BBC Radio 6 Music
Between 2006 until 2012 Holmes presented a BBC Radio 6 Music show every Saturday at 10am, where he "plays some music and messes around in the gaps" alongside his friend and sidekick David Whitehead and producer Adam Hudson. The format of the show was similar to satirist Chris Morris's radio shows from the late 1980s and early '90s. Heavily inspired themes include spoof news items, voiceovers and contributions from children, spoken words from various broadcasters and politicians cut up and re-edited into nonsense and a general subversive edginess very much in the Morris style.

BBC Radio 2
Holmes occasionally replaces holidaying presenters on Radio 2, with co-presenter Miranda Hart. In October 2011 he attracted criticism after co-hosting The Chris Evans Breakfast Show with Hart while Chris Evans was on holiday. The website Digital Spy reported that some listeners were unhappy with the quality of the programme. The BBC issued a statement in response saying, "Miranda Hart is one of the UK's best-loved comedians and BBC Radio 2 felt it appropriate to bring her warmth to its audience for a week. Jon Holmes is a highly experienced presenter from BBC Radio 6 Music [...] BBC Radio 2 appreciates if their presentation wasn't to everyone's liking, but feels it's important to be able to bring new talent to its output and hopes its audience understands the importance of maintaining a breadth of content on the network."

In the summer of 2012, Holmes stood in for comedian Graham Norton, presenting solo on Saturday mornings 10-1. The format was similar to Holmes's BBC 6 Music show but extra features included guests and live music in "His Busker's Voice" which was a live music session from buskers that Holmes had literally "dragged in from the street".

In 2018 Holmes was back on Radio 2 with Jeremy Vine: Agony Uncle, which he wrote and appeared in as 'Tim the producer'. With Lewis MacLeod as Jeremy Vine, it was a 'behind the scenes look at what happens during The Jeremy Vine Show when the records are on'. The premise featured 'Jeremy' taking phone calls to give advice from various celebrities played by impressionists Terry Mynott and Jess Robinson. The show returned for a 2018 Christmas special.

He returned to the network in January 2021 with 'I See Your Soul And Raise You Rock' in which he and the presenter Craig Charles co-hosted a live show in which they championed their own music choices and 'tried to musically educate each other'. The show was well received for the presenters' honest chat about mental health issues and growing up, as well as the music.

XFM and Radio X
Holmes hosted The XFM London Daily Breakfast Show, alongside Matt Dyson, Dave Masterman and a series of interns from 7 January 2013. He was nominated for Best Radio Presenter in the 2015 Commercial Radio Awards.

On 7 September 2015, after a summer of press rumours that he was being axed from XFM in favour of former Radio 1 Breakfast DJ Chris Moyles it was announced that Holmes would be moving from the daily breakfast show to its weekend counterpart, as part of the relaunch of the station as Radio X. It was also confirmed that Moyles would run the new station's breakfast show in direct competition with his Radio 1 successor Nick Grimshaw. In a tweet to his fans Holmes said: "Thanks for all kind twitters. Am indeed going be on the all new shiny #RadioX for weekend breakfast. Starts 26th September."

Holmes left the station in 2016, in order to host a show on Talkradio.

Talkradio
On Monday 7 March 2016, Holmes was revealed to be the afternoon presenter on the newly launched Talkradio. The show came to an end on Friday 12 January 2018 as a result of a major schedule change.

Virgin Radio UK
In January 2018, Holmes joined digital radio station Virgin Radio UK presenting the Sunday drivetime show. He has regularly covered the breakfast and drivetime shows on weekdays since the station re-launched in 2016. He left the station on Sunday 6 May 2018.

BBC Radio Kent
In August 2017, Holmes rejoined BBC Radio and joined BBC Radio Kent replacing James Whale on Saturday mornings from 10am until 2pm, featuring live music from a session studio. In 2018 the show won bronze at the ARIAS Radio Academy Awards.

From January 2019 the show broadcast from 10am until 12pm.

Television
As well as writing extensively for television, Holmes co-wrote and appeared in 2009 Unwrapped, a review of the year for BBC Two but with entirely fabricated news stories with judicious use of re-edited news footage and video archive not dissimilar to Holmes's own Listen Against on Radio 4. The show aired at Christmas 2009 to favourable reviews.

He appeared (in acting roles) in Crackanory on the Dave Channel as well as 'Nick Tesla' in the controversial Channel 4 drama Ukip: The First 100 Days which imagined what it would be like if Ukip won the 2016 UK general election.

He co-wrote BBC1's The Impressions Show with Culshaw and Stephenson. The show was a big hit for Saturday nights and a second series was scheduled to air in autumn 2010. Holmes also co-writes Horrible Histories for BBC One, for which he won two BAFTAs in 2010 as part of the writing team.

Apart from the transfer of Radio 4's Dead Ringers, in 2002 Holmes co-presented the fifth series of The Eleven O'Clock Show on Channel 4 television with Sarah Alexander. He wrote for Graham Norton on his award-winning Channel 4 show V Graham Norton and co-presented BBC3's The State We're In, in which he was beaten up by the SAS. Holmes wrote and appeared in Gash, a nightly politics programme which was broadcast to coincide with the 2003 local elections and presented by Armando Iannucci. He also co-wrote Iannucci's Time Trumpet for BBC2.

In 2005, with Dead Ringerss Jon Culshaw, Holmes co-wrote and script edited ITV1's The Impressionable Jon Culshaw. He also played various roles in various sketches. The show was nominated for the Golden Rose of Montreux TV Award.

Selected other credits include Have I Got News for You, Mock the Week and The Harry Hill Show. He is also the voice of BBC Three's 7 Days and Crash Test Danny for the Discovery Channel.

He regularly appears on Sky News to preview the following morning's newspapers.

Other media
Holmes's first book, Status Quo and the Kangaroo, was published in hardback by Penguin May 2007 and has since been published in Australia, Canada, the US and India and has been translated into Russian. The paperback Rock Star Babylon was published in the UK in September 2008. 2009 saw the publication of another book, The Now Show Book of World Records, which Holmes co-wrote with Steve Punt and Hugh Dennis. He also co-wrote (with Mitch Benn) The History of the World Through Twitter, described as "hundreds of characters from history tweeting each other in 140 characters or less – as if Twitter had existed since the dawn of time.". Both books were published in October 2009.

His comedy memoir, A Portrait of An Idiot As A Young Man – "part memoir, part explanation as to why men are so rubbish" – was published September 2016.

He has been a Sunday Times columnist and has written for The Guardian, The Times and the Radio Times, among others. He is now a travel writer for the Sunday Times, and his 'passport bashing adventures' include learning to scuba dive on the SS Thistlegorm under the Red Sea, biking the Tiger corridor of Northern India, trekking the Himalayas, swimming with blue whales in Sri Lanka, spending time with mountain gorillas on the Rwandan / Congolese border, photographing jaguars in the Pantanal and the Northern Lights above the Arctic Circle, and crocodile hunting with the natives of Papua New Guinea. In 2014 he was hospitalised by a colony of sea urchins off the coast of Puerto Rico.

He's a 3-time nominee for Travel Writer of the Year, and once for Travel Broadcaster of the Year.

Holmes also co-wrote Stephen Fry's script for the BAFTA Film Awards and has hosted the MOJO Awards and the Radio Production Awards.

He toured the UK in 2008/2009 reading from his book Rock Star Babylon (for which Stephen Fry voiced the footnotes) and in August 2009 played the Edinburgh Comedy Festival to nine star reviews, although these stars were fairly well split across various newspapers.

On 15 September 2010, Holmes, along with 54 other public figures, signed an open letter published in The Guardian, stating their opposition to Pope Benedict XVI's state visit to the UK.

In 2016 he hosted Arqiva Commercial Radio Awards.

In 2021, a number of Rock Star Babylon stories (including Status Quo and the Kangaroo), have been adapted into a radio comedy show called Rockanory. The series is due to be broadcast by Absolute Radio and will feature the voices of Shaun Keaveny, Jon Culshaw and Jake Yapp. Holmes has produced the series and has co-written it with Gareth Ceredig.

Awards
Holmes has won two BAFTAs, nine Gold Sony Radio Awards, two British Comedy Awards, a Broadcasting Press Guild Award for Best Radio Show and was a nominee, for The Now Show, for a Channel 4 Political Award. He was also nominated for a Rose D'or for his work on The Impressionable Jon Culshaw, for ITV1.

He has been nominated for two more BAFTAS, a Writers' Guild of Great Britain Award and was made a Distinguished Supporter of Humanists UK.

References

External links

Profile on agent's site
Cyberchat

1973 births
Living people
British radio DJs
BBC Radio 2 presenters
BBC Radio 6 Music presenters
British comedians
British comedy writers
Alumni of Canterbury Christ Church University